Arizona Manhunt is a 1951 American Western film directed by Fred C. Brannon and starring Michael Chapin, Eilene Janssen and James Bell.

The film's sets were designed by the art director Frank Hotaling.

Plot

Cast
 Michael Chapin as 'Red' White  
 Eilene Janssen as Judy Dawson  
 James Bell as Sheriff Tom White  
 Lucille Barkley as Clara Drummond 
 Roy Barcroft as Pete Willard  
 Hazel Shaw as Jane Rowan  
 John Baer as Deputy Jim Brown  
 Harry Harvey as Doctor Sawyer  
 Stuart Randall as Scar Willard  
 Ted Cooper as Henchman Charlie 
 Roy Bucko as Townsman  
 Herman Hack as Townsman  
 Silver Harr as Henchman  
 Wally West as Henchman

References

Bibliography
 Bernard A. Drew. Motion Picture Series and Sequels: A Reference Guide. Routledge, 2013.

External links
 

1951 films
1951 Western (genre) films
1950s English-language films
American Western (genre) films
Films directed by Fred C. Brannon
Republic Pictures films
American black-and-white films
1950s American films